Townsend v. Sain, 372 U.S. 293 (1963), was a United States Supreme Court case wherein the Court expanded the circumstances in which federal courts should hold evidentiary hearings when presented with petitions for habeas corpus by state prisoners following denial of postconviction relief in state court. The Court held that federal district courts must hold evidentiary hearings if the state court did not resolve all material factual disputes in a full and fair hearing supported by the record.

The case centered around Charles Townsend, who was convicted of a series of murders and robberies and sentenced to death. The issue heard in the Supreme Court centered around a confession Townsend had given while under the influence of an alleged "truth serum". Townsend's attorneys argued that the effects of the truth serum had made the confession inadmissible. Townsend appealed the case by filing a writ of habeas corpus against Sheriff Frank G. Sain of Cook County, Illinois. The case made it to Illinois Supreme Court once, and the Supreme Court twice: first in 1959 and again in 1963. The appeals case however did not revolve around the truth serum, but instead procedural questions surrounding a prisoner's right to an evidentiary hearing during the appeal process. 

The court held that Townsend's writ of habeas corpus should not have been summarily denied, and that the lower court should have held an evidentiary hearing to determine the veracity of Townsend's claims. The court repeated its previous decision that coerced confessions were inadmissible, and theorized that a confession via truth serum would thus be inadmissible; the court was careful to avoid saying whether or not Townsend had actually been given a truth serum.

Alongside Fay v. Noia and Sanders v. United States, Townsend is cited as revolutionizing and greatly expanding the use of habeas corpus, leading to it being used as a general purpose appeals tool. However a variety of Supreme Court decisions since then have narrowed its application.

Background 
On December 18, 1953, steelworker Jack Boone was robbed and murdered in Chicago. Police arrested Charles Townsend on January 1, 1954. He was charged on the information of Vincent Campbell. Campbell claimed that he saw Townsend near the scene of the attack, but otherwise little physical evidence linked Townsend to the crime. Townsend was an admitted drug addict, after his arrest he began suffering from symptoms of withdrawal. During his questioning he was attended by a doctor who gave him two drugs to help the withdrawal symptoms: Phenobarbital and Hyoscine. Afterward he confessed to the murder of Boone, agreeing that he had robbed him in order to fund his drug habit. Townsend later claimed that the Hyoscine was a "truth serum" and that his confession was made while he was under its influence, thus making it inadmissible. The police did not seem to know that Townsend had been given Hyoscine.

Case 
The original case went to trial in 1955, where Townsend was convicted of murder and sentenced to death. During the trial, the prosecution brought in the confession of Townsend that had been given while in police custody and suffering from withdrawal. Townsend, via his public defender, objected. Outside the presence of the jury, the court held an evidentiary hearing. Townsend claimed that he had been given a truth serum while being questioned by the police. As a result, he argued any confession gained during the interrogation was inadmissible. However the court denied Townsend an ability to present evidence of such and allowed the confession to be entered. Townsend was subsequently convicted, he would appeal the case repeatedly. The case, as People v. Townsend, eventually made it to the Supreme Court of Illinois, which affirmed the conviction.

At this point Townsend was now in jail, and as a prisoner filed a writ of habeas corpus against his jailers, Sheriff Frank G. Sain of Cook County and Jack Johnson, Warden of the Cook County Jail. The case made it to the Supreme Court in 1959. At major issue through every stage of the appeal was whether the confession had been voluntary. The defense argued that it was not, and that the lower courts should have allowed the defense to make that argument, yet disallowed it. The defense argued that although Hyoscine had not been administered with the intent of being used as a truth serum, its unintended effects made it a truth serum by default. Furthermore, they argued that the police had used the drug as leverage and had verbally and physically coerced Townsend. The defense also contended, with the testimony of an expert pharmacologist, that the administration of Hyoscine would have confused Townsend as well as make him extremely tired for the entirety of the confession, as well as the following morning when he signed his confession. The judgement was vacated by the Supreme Court in 1959 without argument, and the case was remanded back to the lower courts. However the case once again made it to the high court, where it now had a significant legal question which the court allowed for argument in October 1961. However, due to the absence of two justices, the case was reheard in October 1962.

The Supreme court ruled in 1963 that since the state court had not given Townsend's claims a proper hearing, the appellate court ought to have. Since the appellate court had failed to do so, the Supreme Court remanded the case back to the district court for a new hearing. The courts decision cemented that the federal court ought have decided what weight to give the habeas corpus hearing, since such hearings are often critical to a prisoners claim. The court also gave appellate courts the power to retry facts, especially if the defendant did not receive a "full and fair" evidentiary hearing previously. The court's 5-4 split on the issue stemmed from issues of how mandatory a rehearing at the appellate level should be. The Court decided that there were six situations in which a court had to give the prisoner a new hearing. The dissenting minority of the court argued that appeals courts should have greater discretion in hearings, and should not be forced to hold hearings. The court clarified that very few circumstances would deny a prisoners right to a fair evidentiary hearing at the appellate level, and that only a "deliberate bypass" of the state courts would qualify. Incompetence or negligence by the prisoner's lawyer would not affect how they were treated at the appellate level or disqualify them from a new evidentiary hearing. Additionally the court noted that the medical expert for the prosecution had made a mistake by not noting in layman's terms the fact that Hyoscine could possibly act as a truth serum.

The court also confirmed that a confession is inadmissible if it has been coerced from an individual, or if it was "not the product of a rational intellect and a free will". The court thus surmised that a confession taken under the influence of a supposed truth serum would meet those criteria. However the court was careful to avoid actually determining whether the drug in question was in fact a truth serum, or if the confession had been the result of it.

Legacy 
In 1966, responding to the decision of the Court, Congress amended the judicial code with a modified version of the habeas corpus criteria formulated in Townsend. The amendments specified eight circumstances in which the finding of a lower court cannot be presumed and the court must give an evidentiary hearing. They differed in writing and number from the only six cases identified by Justice Warren. However, in cases outside of the eight specified, the burden of proof falls back on the habeas corpus petitioner to show that court fact findings were in error.

Townsend is discussed in Colorado v. Connelly (which set the modern standard for the voluntariness of confessions). Chief Justice Rehnquist called the actions "police wrongdoing", and insinuated that the police knew about the drug and its effects. Commentators Bloom and Brodin suggest this is a "revisionist reading" since the officers apparently did not know about the administration of drugs to Townsend.

The Supreme Court heard Keeney v. Tamayo-Reyes, 504 U.S. 1, in 1992, which modified the decision in Townsend that a prisoner is entitled to a new evidentiary hearing in all but intentional bypassing of the state courts. Instead Keeney established that prisoners must show cause, and that negligence on the part of the attorney could now be considered as a factor in denying habeas corpus. The decision was part of an attempt to streamline the overburdened appeals process, since at the time more than 10,000 habeas corpus requests were filed every year, accounting for almost 5% of all civil cases in federal court. The Supreme Court argued that giving a new evidentiary hearing to every prisoner was overkill, and wasted time and valuable court resources. As a result, only cases in which the prisoner had a legitimate cause would be entitled to new hearings.

See also
Habeas corpus in the United States

References

External links 
 

United States Supreme Court cases
United States Supreme Court cases of the Warren Court
20th-century American trials